Under Suspicion (German title: Vom Täter fehlt jede Spur) is a 1928 German silent crime film directed by Constantin J. David and starring Hanni Weisse, Gritta Ley and Kurt Gerron. After the owner of an amusement park if found murdered, police investigate the principal suspects.

The film's art direction was by Jacek Rotmil.

Cast
 Hanni Weisse as Frieda  
 Gritta Ley as Edith  
 Kurt Gerron as Maxe  
 Fritz Kampers as John 
 Paul Rehkopf as Ogalsky, Ediths Onkel  
 Ernst Stahl-Nachbaur as Kriminalkommissar Dr. Bernburg  
 Ferdinand Hart as Emil  
 Franz Cornelius as Hehler Rasurek  
 Rolf von Goth as Harry Hofer  
 Klaus Pohl as Otto  
 Michael von Newlinsky as Kriminalkommissar Anschütz

References

Bibliography
 Kristin Thompson. Herr Lubitsch Goes to Hollywood: German and American Film After World War I. Amsterdam University Press, 2005.

External links

1928 films
Films of the Weimar Republic
German silent feature films
Films directed by Constantin J. David
1928 crime films
German crime films
UFA GmbH films
German black-and-white films
1920s German films